The Central Iapetus magmatic province (CIMP) was a large igneous province (LIP) that occurred during the Ediacaran (615–550 ) between several ancient continents – Laurentia and Baltica and, possibly, Amazonia – during the break-up of the supercontinent Rodinia and resulted in the opening of the Iapetus Ocean.

Evidences for the CIMP have also been found in Mexico, Morocco, and Svalbard.

The CIMP coincides with the Marinoan and Gaskiers glaciations and precedes the so-called Cambrian explosion, the evolution of modern lineages.

The CIMP left extensive traces along the Appalachians in eastern North America to which the Baltoscandian margin a conjugate.  No traces of the CIMP have been found in Amazonia, however, and it is possible Laurentia and Amazonia separated during 1000 Ma-rifting events.

Four pulses of magmatism associated with the CIMP have been identified:
 The first pulse (615–610 Ma) left extensive traces in the Long Range dykes in Labrador, Canada, but also in the Sarek and Ottfjället dyke swarms of the Scandinavian Caledonides, possibly in Greenland.
 Evidences of a second pulse (590 Ma) can be found in the Grenville-Rideau dykes in eastern Laurentia and the Fen and Alnö complexes in Baltica.
 A third pulse (560–570 Ma) left many traces along the Saint Lawrence rift system, for example the Sept Iles layered intrusion and the Catoctin volcanics, and the Labrador Sea-Baffin Bay Rift, including the Manitou Islands.
 A fourth pulse (c. 550 Ma) left many traces in Laurentia and events in Baltica can be linked to it.

It is unclear whether the CIMP was a single plume centre event or not.  The first two pulses have a composition indicative of a LIP, while the last pulse contains ocean island basalts and can therefore be associated with the opening Iapetus Ocean.

References

Notes

Sources

 
 }

Large igneous provinces